Suimenkul Chokmorov (Süymönqul Çoqmorov; ; 9 November 1939 – 26 September 1992) was a Kyrgyz film actor born in Chong-Tash village, Kirghiz SSR (now Kyrgyzstan). In 1964 he graduated from the Leningrad Academy of Arts and later taught painting and composition at the Arts School of Frunze. In 1977 he was a member of the jury at the 10th Moscow International Film Festival.

Filmography

References

External links

1939 births
1992 deaths
Kyrgyzstani male actors
People's Artists of the USSR
Soviet male film actors
20th-century Kyrgyzstani actors
People from Chüy Region
Burials at Ala-Archa Cemetery
Recipients of the Lenin Komsomol Prize
Communist Party of the Soviet Union members
Repin Institute of Arts alumni